Unionistas de Salamanca Club de Fútbol is a Spanish football club in Salamanca, in the autonomous community of Castile and León. Founded in 2013, the club plays in Primera División RFEF – Group 1, holding home games at Campo de Fútbol Reina Sofía with a 5,000-seat capacity.

History
After UD Salamanca's dissolution, a group of supporters founded Unionistas de Salamanca Club de Fútbol, a fan-based club created mainly to preserve UDS' memory. After the club's creation, famous people like Vicente del Bosque and Dani Rovira became associates. A number of British citizens resident in Spain and England are also members. The fees contributed by the members of the club are a very important part of club's budget. 2,653 people who decided to become partial owners the club, all at individual title, in season 2018–2019.  During the first season following its foundation, the club played home games at the “Rosa Colorado” municipal stadium.

On 2 September 2014, Unionistas was inscribed in Primera Provincial de Salamanca, the sixth level of Spanish football. A day later it played its first official match, a 0–1 friendly loss against UD Santa Marta.

Unionistas achieved promotion to Primera Regional in April 2015, after defeating Real Salamanca Monterrey. Just one year later, it was promoted to Tercera División after defeating Onzonilla.

The first season of the club in Tercera division was successful, as it ended in the third position of the Castile and León group and qualified to the promotion play-offs to Segunda División B. The club qualified for a second attempt in the next season, after topping the group 8. This time it achieved promotion by defeating Socuéllamos in the last match, with a penalty kick scored in the 96th minute.

The first season in Segunda Division B was successful, as the team managed to finish in ninth place, avoiding relegation and qualifying for the Copa del Rey the following season.

In their debut in Copa del Rey, Unionistas reached the round of 32nd after beating Atlético Baleares and Deportivo La Coruña. In that round, they were eliminated by powerhouse Real Madrid, after losing 1–3. In the league, the season was more difficult. After first 11 league games the club was holding 19th position among 20 teams. However, the club avoided relegation after leaving the last positions and following the suspension of the league due to the COVID-19 pandemic.

Club background
Unión Deportiva Salamanca - (1923–2013)

Season to season

2 season in Primera División RFEF
3 seasons in Segunda División B
2 seasons in Tercera División

Detailed list of seasons

Current squad
.

Reserve team

Out on loan

Honours
Tercera División: 2017–18

Notable players
Players who have reached international status or reached 100 league matches for the club
  Junior
  David Mitogo

Stadium
In its first season, Unionistas de Salamanca played its home games at Polideportivo Rosa Colorado, commonly known as La Sindical, with a capacity of 2,000 spectators.

Since 2015, the club has played its games at Pistas del Helmántico (next to Helmántico Stadium), with a capacity of 3,000 spectators.

On 11 November 2017, it was announced that a new stadium would be built in the Zurguén district, in the southern part of Salamanca. The new home of Unionistas, "Estadio Zurguén" will presumably be open for the 2019–2020 season. Roughly one year later, however, the club announced an agreement with Real Salamanca Monterrey CF and the City Council to use the Reina Sofía stadium, with a planned expansion to 5,000 spectators; the transition to the new field was concluded for the 2020–21 season, and was announced by the club on 5 October 2020.

Rivalries
Unionistas de Salamanca has a strong rivalry with Salamanca UDS, formerly known as Salmantino. Both teams meet in their matches, called the derby of the 50 metres as their stadiums are separated by this distance.

While Unionistas was born as a homage of former UD Salamanca, dissolved in 2013, Salamanca CF claims it is its continuation by using their name and their shield, despite a judicial statement established it is a completely different club.

References

External links
Official website 
Statistics data base 
Club & stadium history Estadios de España 

Football clubs in Castile and León
Association football clubs established in 2013
2013 establishments in Castile and León
Sport in Salamanca
Phoenix clubs (association football)
Fan-owned football clubs
Primera Federación clubs